Desert Hills  may refer to:
Desert Hills, Arizona, a census-designated place in Mohave County, Arizona
Desert Hills, Maricopa County, Arizona, an unincorporated community in Maricopa County, Arizona
Desert Hills (Nevada), a mountain range in Lincoln County, Nevada

Related names include
Desert Hills High School, a high school in St. George, Utah
Desert Mountains, a mountain range in Lyon and Churchill Counties, Nevada
Desert Range, a mountain range in Clark County, Nevada